New Zealand competed at the 2016 Winter Youth Olympics in Lillehammer, Norway from 12 to 21 February 2016.

Medalists

Alpine skiing

Boys

Girls

Curling

Mixed team

Team
Matthew Neilson
Ben Smith
Courtney Smith
Holly Thompson

Round Robin

Draw 1

Draw 2

Draw 3

Draw 4

Draw 5

Draw 6

Draw 7

Mixed doubles

Freestyle skiing

Halfpipe

Slopestyle

Ice hockey

Snowboarding

Halfpipe

Slopestyle

See also
New Zealand at the 2016 Summer Olympics

References

2016 in New Zealand sport
Nations at the 2016 Winter Youth Olympics
New Zealand at the Youth Olympics